St Sebastian is a painting, once part of a triptych by the Italian Renaissance artist Antonello da Messina, completed in 1477–1479. It is  housed in the Gemäldegalerie Alte Meister, Dresden, Germany.

History
The visit of the Sicilian artist Antonello da Messina to Venice in 1475–1476 has traditionally been seen as turning point in the history of the city's painting – Giorgio Vasari crediting him with introducing oil painting to Venice. Antonello painted two altarpieces for Venetian churches, one for the church of San Cassiano, and the other, of which the St Sebastian once formed part, for the altar of the Scuola di San Rocca in the parish church of San Giuliano. It has often been assumed to have been painted in Venice in 1476, but it may have been painted only after Antonello's return to Sicily in the autumn of that year. A description by Francesco Sansovino, dating from 1581, indicates that the altarpiece consisted of a wooden statue of St Roche, flanked by painted panels showing St Christopher and St Sebastian. Sansovino describes the panel of St Christopher  as being by  Antonello, and that of St Sebastian as being by "Pino da Messina" (i.e. his son Jacobello or "Jacopino"). However  art historians have  generally accepted  Antonello's authorship of the St Sebastian.  The statue and the painting of St Christopher are now lost.

Description

This picture, dominated by the vertical figure of the saint, shows a marked influence by Piero della Francesca: this can be seen in particular in the perspective of the floor and in the "mathematical" disposition of the figurative elements. Original to Antonello is the smooth rendering of the body of St. Sebastian (defying any geometrical break-down) and the passion for the details of landscape, seen for example in Umbrian school painters like Carlo Crivelli.

Famous details include the man reclining on the left, the typical Venetian-style chimneys, the columns and the monumental appearance of the buildings (probably inspired by some of Mantegna's works) and the debating pairs of men on the right side, forming an interesting mixing of late Gothic elements with Venetian, Flemish and advanced Renaissance ones.

Notes and references

Sources

Further reading

Paintings by Antonello da Messina
1470s paintings
Antonello da Messina
Paintings in the Gemäldegalerie, Berlin